Zoŋ (or Zong) is a traditional mostly round-shaped room used by the Dagomba as an assembly hall in a chief's palace or a large family house.

References

Dagbaŋ culture
Ghanaian culture